Three ships of the Royal Navy have borne the name HMS Princess Louisa, after Princess Louisa:

She was rebuilt in 1728 and renamed HMS Princess Louisa. She was wrecked in 1736.
  was a 60-gun fourth rate launched in 1744 and broken up by 1766.

Royal Navy ship names